New Hampshire elected its members between November 1, 1824 and March 8, 1825. New Hampshire law required candidates to receive votes from a majority of voters for election. As only five candidates received votes from a majority of voters, a run-off election had to be held for the sixth seat on March 8, 1825.

See also 
 1824 and 1825 United States House of Representatives elections
 List of United States representatives from New Hampshire

1824
New Hampshire
New Hampshire
United States House of Representatives
United States House of Representatives